Parshurampur is a common name for places in South Asia, named after Parshuram, an incarnation of Vishnu. It may refer to:
 Parshurampur, Bara, a former Village Development Committee in Bara District of Nepal
 Parshurampur, Parsa, a former Village Development Committee in Parsa District of Nepal